The Faculty of Engineering is one of the four faculties which make up the University of Strathclyde in Glasgow, Scotland. The faculty contains multiple departments offering many different undergraduate and postgraduate courses. These range from BEng, MEng and MSc courses to doctorates throughout the faculty.

Introduction

The Faculty of Engineering at Strathclyde offers over 40 undergraduate courses and postgraduate courses, each, which cover a wide range of disciplines. These courses are taught in one of the eight departments of the University of Strathclyde for Engineering.

It teaches over 4,000 students, who come from many different countries. 3,000 of these are undergraduates, 650 are postgraduates being taught, and 500 are at the university to do research.

Departments
The faculty has eight departments. These are:
 Architecture
 Biomedical Engineering
 Chemical and Process Engineering
 Civil and Environmental Engineering
 Design, Manufacture and Engineering Management
 Electronic and Electrical Engineering
 Mechanical and Aerospace engineering
 Naval Architecture and Marine Engineering

Architecture
The department moved to the James-Weir building in August 2013.

Part of the department contains The Centre for Research in Sustainability and Design (CRiDAS). This is a centre that works on the implementation and improvement of technology to help reduce environmental and social impacts of buildings.

Strathclyde was ranked the 11th best university for architecture in 2013 by TheCompleteUniversityGuide.

Biomedical Engineering
The Department of Biomedical Engineering is located at Wolfson Centre. The Department incorporates the National Centre for Prosthetics and Orthotics which is one of only two institutions in the UK offering undergraduate and postgraduate education in Prosthetics and Orthotics. The Centre's interests in training, education and research span the fields of prosthetics, orthotics and related aspects of the provision of aids for the disabled.

Chemical and Process Engineering
The Strathclyde University Department of Chemical and Process Engineering is located at James Weir Building. Chemical Engineering at Strathclyde was rated the best in Scotland in the last Scottish Higher Education Funding Council Teaching Quality Assessment. All of the BEng, MEng and MSc courses are fully accredited by the Institution of Chemical Engineers.

The Department also specialises in advanced computational modelling; looking at materials and processes on all scales from the atomic to the macroscopic. Strathclyde University Chemical and Process Engineering has been ranked 16th by Complete University Guide and rated 13th by The Guardian in 2013.

Civil and Environmental Engineering

Design, Manufacture and Engineering Management (DMEM) 
The department is located on Level 7 of the James Weir Building.  DMEM was founded in 1989 through a merger between the former Department of Production Management and Manufacturing Technology, the Design Division (formerly part of the Department of Mechanical Engineering) and the CAD Centre research group.  One of its most notable academics was Stuart Pugh, creator of the "Total Design" methodology which became an industry standard.  Pugh served as Professor and head of the department from 1989 until his death in 1993.

Electronic and Electrical Engineering

The department is located within the Royal College of Science and Technology Building.

Department of Mechanical and Aerospace Engineering
The department of Mechanical and Aerospace Engineering is located in the University of Strathclyde's James Weir building.

Primary research is carried out via its research centres and laboratories in Fluids, Energy, Aerospace engineering and Materials science: Aerospace Centre of Excellence (including Advanced Space Concepts Laboratory, Future Air-Space Transportation Technology, and Intelligent Computational Engineering Laboratory), Energy Systems Research Unit, James Weir Fluids Laboratory, Mechanics & Materials Research Centre.

Naval Architecture and Marine Engineering
The Department of Naval Architecture and Marine Engineering is located at the University of Strathclyde's Henry Dyer Building. The BEng and MEng courses are accredited by the Royal Institution of Naval Architects (RINA) and the Institute of Marine Engineering, Science and Technology (IMarEST) on behalf of the Engineering Council.

Staff

Staff Numbers

As of July 2017 there were 23 key members of staff in the Faculty of Engineering (not including the staff of each department),.

Dean of Faculty

The Executive Dean of the Faculty of Engineering is a Professor Atilla Incecik.

Research
Researchers at the Aerospace Centre of Excellence have led the €4 million, Europe-wide Stardust project, a research-based training network investigating the removal of space debris and the deflection of asteroids, and the first programme of its kind in the world.

Competitions
A team of three students by the name of Team Hydra, composed of Eric Brown, Hugh McQueen and Theo Scott, developed and entered a solution to reduce the cost of passenger kilometers in Germany. The competition they entered the solution into was called the BP Ultimate Field Trip, they won the first prize and even the runners up were a combined team from Strathclyde and Glasgow.

See also 
University of Strathclyde
University of Strathclyde Faculty of Science
Strathclyde Business School
Royal College of Science and Technology
James Weir Building

References

Strath
University of Strathclyde